Core Knowledge UK is a project by the think tank Civitas. The Core Knowledge Sequence UK is a year-by-year outline of the specific and shared content and skills to be taught in Years 1 to 6.

Origins of Core Knowledge UK
The Core Knowledge Foundation was formed in 1986. The American Core Knowledge curriculum was piloted in Three Oaks Elementary School in Florida in 1990. Today it is used in hundreds of schools across America and Civitas has adapted the American Core Knowledge Sequence to use in British schools.

History
Over the past 20 years, the Core Knowledge Foundation has developed and refined the Core Knowledge Sequence in partnership with schools implementing the curriculum. Core Knowledge has been reported to be effective in the US.

Notes

External links
 Core Knowledge UK official website
 Civitas official website
 Core Knowledge Foundation (US) official website
 National Curriculum online official website 
 Department for Education (England)

Educational charities